Gurkha Memorial may refer to:

 Gurkha Memorial, Aldershot, Rushmoor, Hampshire, England
 Gurkha Memorial, London, England
 Gurkha Memorial Garden, at Sir Harold Hillier Gardens, in Romsey, Hampshire, England
 Gurkha Memorial Park, Dharan, Nepal
 A statue at Menin Gate, Ypres, Belgium